"White Mercedes" is a song by English singer-songwriter Charli XCX. It was released on 23 October 2019 by Asylum and Atlantic UK as the fourth and final single from her third studio album Charli (2019). It was written by Charli XCX and produced by A.G. Cook, Andrew Watt and Happy Perez. The song is an emotional pop ballad about burning through a relationship with her boyfriend and throwing it away. An accompanying music video for the single, directed by Colin Solal Cardo, features Charli interacting with a sports car, a horse and a monster truck, all colored in white.

Background and composition 
Lyrically, in Paper Magazine, Charli XCX explained that every time she comes back to her relationship, she becomes "this annoying, hectic person" and her boyfriend, Huck Kwong, ends up getting hurt. Charli acknowledges she is undeserving of his love.

"White Mercedes" is described as an emotional ballad song. The song is composed in  time and the key of D major, with a tempo of 130 beats per minute.

Music video

Synopsis

The video starts with Charli performing inside a white sports car that's upside down, which later bursts into flames. She then interacts with a white horse and rides in the backseat of a white monster truck that crushes other cars. In the video, Charli is seen wearing a pink fluffy gown with multi-colored chains, leather knee-high boots and a slicked-back ponytail. The video was set in Kyiv, the capital city of Ukraine.

Release
The song's music video was directed by Colin Solal Cardo and premiered on 10 October 2019 at Charli XCX's YouTube account.

Live performances
On 26 September 2019, Charli XCX performed "White Mercedes" in the Artists Den concert at Rooftop at Pier 17 in New York City and she also performed it during the Pitchfork Music Festival in Paris on 1 November 2019. The singer performed the song throughout her Charli Live Tour in 2019 and 2020.

Formats and track listings
Digital download – Remixes EP

 "White Mercedes" [EDX's Miami Sunset Remix] – 3:20
 "White Mercedes"  [PBH & Jack Remix] – 3:10
 "White Mercedes"  [Martin Vogel Remix] – 2:53

Credits and personnel

Location 
Recorded at: Andrew Watt's house

Personnel 
Credits adapted from Tidal.

 Charli XCX – vocals, songwriter, executive producer
 A.G. Cook – executive producer, additional production, programmer
 Andrew Watt – songwriter, producer, guitar, keyboards, programmer
 Happy Perez - songwriter, producer, guitar, keyboards, programmer
 Serban Ghenea – mixer
 Chad Smith – drums
 Ali Tamposi – songwriter
 Nathan Perez – songwriter
 Stuart Hawkes – masterer
 John Hanes – engineerer
 David Rodriguez – engineerer

Release history

References

2019 singles
2019 songs
Charli XCX songs
Asylum Records singles
Atlantic Records UK singles
Songs written by Charli XCX
Songs written by Happy Perez
Songs written by Andrew Watt (record producer)
Songs written by Ali Tamposi
Song recordings produced by Andrew Watt (record producer)